Jilen Christine Siroky (born November 20, 1981), also known by her married name Jilen Bouwer, is an American former competition swimmer who represented the United States at the 1996 Summer Olympics in Atlanta, Georgia.  She competed in the B Final of the women's 200-meter breaststroke, and finished with the fifteenth overall time (2:33.43).

She now resides in the Chicago area with her husband Jason Bouwer and their children.

See also
 List of University of Notre Dame alumni

References

General
 

1981 births
Living people
American female breaststroke swimmers
Notre Dame Fighting Irish women's swimmers
Olympic swimmers of the United States
Sportspeople from Winter Park, Florida
Swimmers at the 1996 Summer Olympics